Cristóbal Emilio "Curro" Torres Ruiz (born 27 December 1976) is a Spanish retired footballer who played as a right-back, currently manager of Estonian club FCI Levadia Tallinn.

In his professional career, whose later years were blighted by several injuries, he represented mainly Valencia, helping the team to two La Liga championships (playing 119 matches at that level over eight seasons and scoring once) and the 2004 UEFA Cup. He appeared for Spain at the 2002 World Cup.

Torres started working as a manager in 2014, spending three years at Valencia B.

Early life
Torres was born in Ahlen, North Rhine-Westphalia, West Germany. His parents hailed from Granada, and emigrated to Germany for employment. When their son was still an infant they moved back to Spain, settling in Catalonia.

Club career

Valencia
Torres began his career with UDA Gramenet before joining Valencia CF in 1997. He was a regular with the B team for two seasons, being loaned out to Recreativo de Huelva and CD Tenerife the next two years. In the latter, alongside Mista and Luis García, he was a key member of the Canary Islands club – coached by Rafael Benítez– that won promotion to La Liga.

Torres then returned to Valencia, where he proceeded to become a key member in the sides that won the national league twice and the 2003–04 UEFA Cup, again under Benítez. From early 2005 onwards, however, he would be severely hindered by injuries, although he appeared in 17 games in the 2006–07 campaign, mainly as a left-back due to Emiliano Moretti's forced absence.

For 2007–08, Torres was loaned to top-flight newcomers Real Murcia, where his physical problems resurfaced (two league appearances). Upon their relegation he returned to Valencia, being restricted to two UEFA Cup matches during the season, with even midfielder Hedwiges Maduro being preferred as Miguel's backup; he left the Che in June 2009.

Later years
On 27 July 2009, Torres moved to Gimnàstic de Tarragona of Segunda División, playing no minutes whatsoever in the season (league or cup) as Nàstic finished in 18th position. In January of the following year, after the loan acquisitions of Borja Viguera and Álex Bergantiños by the club, the 34-year-old's contract was cancelled.

Coaching
On 7 April 2014, Torres returned to Valencia after nearly five years, being appointed manager of the reserves in the Segunda División B. In 2017 he took them to the final round of the play-offs, being knocked out by Albacete Balompié.

On 2 July 2017, Torres was named Lorca FC manager. On 17 December, with the side in the relegation zone, he was sacked.

Torres was appointed at NK Istra 1961 from the Croatian First Football League on 20 September 2018, but left the club after only one month in charge. On 19 November he replaced the fired José Ramón Sandoval at the helm of Córdoba CF, and was dismissed on 25 February 2019 having earned fewer points (ten) than any other second division team during that period.

On 27 December 2019, Torres was named manager of second-tier CD Lugo after the sacking of Eloy Jiménez. He was himself relieved of his duties six months later, with the team second-bottom.

International career
Courtesy of solid performances whilst at Valencia, Torres made his debut for Spain on 14 November 2001 in a friendly with Mexico in Huelva (1–0 win), and was a member of the 2002 FIFA World Cup squad, where he appeared against South Africa in the group stage.

Managerial statistics

Honours
Valencia
La Liga: 2001–02, 2003–04
Copa del Rey: 1998–99
UEFA Cup: 2003–04
UEFA Super Cup: 2004
UEFA Intertoto Cup: 1998

See also
List of Spain international footballers born outside Spain

References

External links

CiberChe biography and stats 

1976 births
Living people
People from Ahlen
People of Andalusian descent
German people of Spanish descent
Citizens of Spain through descent
Sportspeople from Münster (region)
Spanish footballers
Footballers from Catalonia
Footballers from North Rhine-Westphalia
Association football defenders
La Liga players
Segunda División players
Segunda División B players
CF Damm players
UDA Gramenet footballers
Valencia CF Mestalla footballers
Valencia CF players
Recreativo de Huelva players
CD Tenerife players
Real Murcia players
Gimnàstic de Tarragona footballers
UEFA Cup winning players
Spain international footballers
2002 FIFA World Cup players
Catalonia international footballers
Spanish football managers
Segunda División managers
Segunda División B managers
Primera Federación managers
Valencia CF Mestalla managers
Lorca FC managers
Córdoba CF managers
CD Lugo managers
Cultural Leonesa managers
Croatian Football League managers
NK Istra 1961 managers
FCI Levadia Tallinn managers
Spanish expatriate football managers
Expatriate football managers in Croatia
Expatriate football managers in Estonia
Spanish expatriate sportspeople in Croatia
Spanish expatriate sportspeople in Estonia